The Embassy of Eswatini in Taipei is the embassy of Eswatini in Taipei, Republic of China (Taiwan). The two countries have had diplomatic relations since Swaziland's independence in 1968. However, Swaziland was initially represented in Taipei by a Consulate.

This tiny kingdom is one of the 15 countries that has diplomatic relations with Taiwan. After the diplomatic breakdown between Burkina Faso and Taiwan in May 2018, Eswatini is the only country in Africa which has no diplomatic relations with the People's Republic of China.

Its counterpart body in Eswatini is the Embassy of the Republic of China (Taiwan) in Mbabane, the Kingdom of Eswatini.

See also
 Eswatini–Taiwan relations
 List of diplomatic missions in Taiwan 
 Foreign relations of Eswatini

References

Taipei
Eswatini
Eswatini–Taiwan relations